The 5th Gran Premio dell'Autodromo di Monza was a Formula Two motor race held on 8 June 1952 at the Monza Circuit, Italy. The race was run over two heats each of 35 laps, with the winner being decided by aggregate time. The winner was Giuseppe Farina in a Ferrari 500, who also set overall fastest lap. Farina's teammate André Simon was second and Rudi Fischer third in a privateer 500. Ferrari driver Alberto Ascari started from pole in both heats and set fastest lap in heat 1 but succumbed to mechanical failure in heat 2. Ascari won heat 1 and Farina won heat 2.

Classification

Race 

1Heat 1 grid; grid places for heat 2 were determined by the finishing order in heat 1

References

Monza
Monza